Viktor Bannikov Memorial Tournament is annual summer association football friendly competition for junior teams that take place in various cities of Ukraine, since 1998. This tournament was created in honour and memory of the legendary goalkeeper of the USSR national football team and the first president of the Football Federation of Ukraine Viktor Bannikov (1938-2001), hence the name Memorial. The tournament was initially established in 1998 as a competition for junior teams of Ukrainian football clubs. Victor Bannikov opened his first edition. It was contested by 12 teams. DFK "ATEK" won defeating opponents from FC Dynamo Kyiv. In 1999, the tournament has received international status and was contested by 16 junior teams. In 2002, the Ukrainian football federation has decided to give more importance professional status, inviting the participation of junior national teams.

The tournament recently gained FIFA recognition and support.

General rules

Since 2002, the tournament participants are a two group of four selected under-17 national teams. From 2005 the tournament participants have been the under-16 national teams. The winners of group play in the final, the second place teams play match for the 3rd place, the third team in group play match for 5th place, the fourth team in the group play match for 7th place.

The games of the tournament were played at stadiums in Kyiv and towns in Kyiv Oblast: Boryspil, Makariv, Obukhiv, Borodianka.

In 2008 the games of the U-16 international tournament were played at stadiums in Donetsk and Mariupol.

Champions

References

External links 
 Statistics of all tournaments 2002-2017, calendar and reglament of the 2018 tournament
  Official Website
  Old Official Website
 Victor Bannikov Memorial U-17 Tournament at RSSSF

International association football competitions hosted by Ukraine
Recurring sporting events established in 1998
1998 establishments in Ukraine
Youth association football competitions for international teams